The Serendib International Cup (known as the Dialog Serendib International Cup for sponsorship reasons) was an international rugby union competition for emerging nations held in Sri Lanka in 2013 (Serendib is the old Arabic, Persian and Urdu name for Sri Lanka). The Serendib Cup was contested by the hosts Sri Lanka and the Malagasy and Polish national rugby teams. The tournament was backed by the International Rugby Board and was played over three match days in Colombo between 26 October and 1 November, coinciding with the 2013 end-of-year rugby union tests.

The tournament served as a pan-regional competition in Asia that will further the profile of Asian rugby and international rugby in Sri Lanka, as the region prepares to host the Rugby World Cup for the first time in 2019 in Japan. The tournament also provided an invaluable platform to step up in performance and ranking for all three Unions as well as the opportunity for the emerging nations to play internationals matches outside of their own region.

The competition was set bring together thriving Unions that are experiencing unprecedented growth, participation and interest in the sport. Its future plans are to make it into a second tier World Cup, which is set to expand to 16-24 teams in the years to come. It will be the launch of a new era in Sri Lankan Rugby as the country is becoming a leading contender in Asia.

The competition was won by Madagascar following their 17-12 victory over the hosts on Day 1, and their 25-21 victory over Poland on Day 2.

Background
The three participating unions are high performance emerging nations with the sport having an ever growing presence. The competition comes as all three unions are still in the process for qualifying for a place in the 2015 Rugby World Cup. The national sport in Madagascar, Test matches regularly attract 40,000 capacity crowds against others high performers of the region such as Kenya, Namibia and Zimbabwe. Madagascar is two wins away from qualifying for the 2015 Rugby World Cup placing third in the 2013 Africa Cup. Poland is a highly competitive FIRA-AER Union currently placing third in the 2012–14 European Nations Cup First Division B.

Sri Lanka has one of the largest number of registered players in the world currently boasting 58,000 players, positioning the Union within the top 15 in the world. With Sri Lanka's win the 2013 Asian Five Nations division 1, the 2014 Asian Five Nations will see their return to the top ranks of the championships. This tournament will be preparation for the Union's high performance programme for next year's Asian 5 Nations. The winner will qualify directly to 2015 Rugby World Cup as Asia 1, while the runner-up will enter the Repechage.

For the development of the sport in Sri Lanka, the hosting of such a tournament is key in growing awareness by building stronger commercial and broadcasting platforms. It comes in addition to the annual Asian Five Nations Asian championship, founded in 2008. Rugby in Sri Lanka is  currently worth more than 1–2 billion Rupees and is widespread throughout the country. According to SLRFU President Asanga Seneviratne rugby could become Sri Lanka’s most popular sport within the next decade. The SLRFU envisions the tournament to becoming a second-tier world cup.

Namal Rajapaksa has been named as the captain of the Sri Lankan team ahead of the tournament, as Yoshitha Rajapaksa is out of the squad due to injuries.

Format
The tournament is a round-robin, where each team plays one match against each of the other teams, with points being awarded at the end of each match: 4 points for a win, 3 points for a draw and 0 points for a loss. Bonus points are also awarded: 1 point for scoring 4 tries or more in a match whether the teams losses or not and 1 point for a loss within 7 game points. A loss by 8 points or more would give the team no bonus point.

Participants

Table

Pre-tournament IRB rankings in parentheses.

Points are awarded to the teams as follows:

Fixtures
All matches are to be played under lights.

Sri Lanka v Madagascar

Madagascar v Poland

Sri Lanka v Poland

Statistics

Points scorers

Try scorers

Squads

Sponsorship & Broadcasting rights
Dialog are the title sponsors of the tournament as the premier sports sponsors in the country, while MTV Sports is set to broadcast all matches live as the tournament’s official broadcaster. Atom Technologies  is the other  principal sponsor of the tournament as well as the official digital signage provider at all the matches.

See also
 2013 IRB Tbilisi Cup
 2013 end-of-year rugby union tests

References

External links
 Sri Lanka Rugby Football Union

Rugby union competitions in Asia for national teams
International rugby union competitions hosted by Sri Lanka
Sri Lanka national rugby union team
Poland national rugby union team
Madagascar national rugby union team
2013 in Asian rugby union
2013 in Sri Lankan sport
2013 in Polish sport
2013 in Madagascar